MetLife Stadium is a roofless multi-purpose stadium at the Meadowlands Sports Complex in East Rutherford, New Jersey, 5 mi (8 km) west of New York City. Opened in 2010 to replace Giants Stadium, it serves as the home for the New York Giants and New York Jets of the National Football League (NFL). At an approximate cost of $1.6 billion, it was the most expensive stadium built in the United States at the time of its completion.

MetLife Stadium is one of only two NFL stadiums shared by two teams. The other, SoFi Stadium in Inglewood, California, is home to the Los Angeles Rams and Los Angeles Chargers. Los Angeles' Crypto.com Arena, which is home to the Los Angeles Lakers and the Los Angeles Clippers of the National Basketball Association (NBA), is only the third facility to currently house two teams from the same sports league in the United States (the Clippers are expected to move into the Intuit Dome in 2024). Additionally, MetLife Stadium is the fourth building in the New York metropolitan area to be home to multiple teams from the same sports league, after the Polo Grounds, which was home to the baseball Giants and Yankees from 1913 to 1922, Shea Stadium, which housed both the Mets and Yankees during the 1974 and 1975 seasons and both the Jets and Giants in 1975, and Giants Stadium, which hosted both the Giants and Jets from 1984 to 2009. MetLife Stadium hosted Super Bowl XLVIII and will host multiples matches during the 2026 FIFA World Cup.

History
As Giants Stadium approached 30 years of age, it was becoming one of the older stadiums in the NFL. The Jets, who had been the tenants to the Giants, were looking to have a proposed West Side Stadium built in Manhattan proper. Originally intended to be the 85,000-seat main stadium for New York's bid for the 2012 Summer Olympics, it was designed to be downsized to 75,000 seats for the Jets. However, it would have required significant public funding; progress on the project was halted in 2005 due to opposition from a number of sources, including Cablevision. The Jets then entered into a joint venture with the Giants to build a new stadium in which the two New York teams would be equal partners.

Design

The architects were tasked with designing a neutral stadium that would still embody the distinct personalities of both franchises. The Giants favored a traditional look of exposed steel framework and rusticated stone while the Jets wanted a sleek and modern look highlighted by metal and glass. With those features in mind the designers used the column/tower dynamic seen in many of Manhattan's skyscrapers as inspiration for the stadium's design.

The base of the stadium's facade is clad in limestone-like stonework while the rest of the stadium is distinguished by an outer skin of aluminum louvers and glass and by interior lighting capable of switching colors, depending on which team is currently playing–blue for the Giants and green for the Jets. This idea originated at the Allianz Arena in Munich, Germany; which was previously shared between the city's two major soccer clubs, Bayern Munich and 1860 Munich. Unlike Giants Stadium, MetLife Stadium can easily be reconfigured for the Giants or Jets within a matter of hours. The louvers' total linear length is exactly 50,000 meters (50 kilometers) or 163,681 feet (31.1 miles).

To change the field decorations, two 4-person crews take approximately 18 hours using forklifts and other machinery to remove the 40 sections of Act Global UBU Speed Series which make up the teams' respective end zones. Unlike most NFL stadiums, the NFL's logo is painted at midfield, instead of the logo of one of the teams, also shortening the transition time. Replaceable team logos at midfield were removed in August 2010, after Domenik Hixon tore his anterior cruciate ligament at a practice at the stadium during training camp. If the two teams are playing each other, the designated home team will have its configuration around the stadium. During their annual preseason matchup, both the Giants and the Jets will have an end zone with their team logo.

Unlike a number of other new NFL venues, MetLife Stadium does not have a roof, as proposals to include a roof failed, over a dispute for funding. Thus, indoor events such as the Final Four cannot be held at the facility, which runs counter to the original aims for a new arena in northern New Jersey.

Ten giant HD-ready light emitting diode (LED) pylons, located at the north, south, east, and west entrances, display videos of the team currently in-house. Inside, are four  by  HD video displays, and hang from each corner of the upper deck.

The new stadium seating bowl is laid out similar to that of Giants Stadium and has seating for 82,500 people, including 10,005 club seats and approximately 218 luxury suites, making it the largest NFL stadium in terms of total seating. The seating bowl is also raked in a way that eliminates overhangs from the upper decks that would impede views and allows fans to see the full arc of a  punt.

MetLife Stadium includes a total of four locker rooms: one each for the Giants and Jets, as well as two for visiting teams. The home teams have locker rooms on opposite ends of the stadium with a visitors' locker room adjacent to it. On most game days the visitors use the locker room at the end opposite that of the home team while the unused visitors' locker room is used for spillover by the home team. For games in which neither the Giants or Jets are playing, each team uses one of the visitor's locker rooms. When the Giants and Jets play each other, each team uses its own locker room plus the adjacent visitor's room for spillover.

In 2012, DLR Group partnered with NRG Energy to design and install a "Solar Ring" on the upper rim of MetLife Stadium. The Solar Ring consists of 1,350 building integrated photovoltaic (BIPV) solar panels assembled into 47 individual frames. The BIPV panels are illuminated with LED lighting and programmed to display the signature blue and green colors of the Giants and the Jets along with other hues for events such as concerts, soccer matches, and college sports. The panels generate about 350 KW, nearly 25 times the amount of electricity that's actually needed to power the LED display system. The excess power generated can go into the general stadium use or back to the grid.

Technical agreements

Lease terms

The two teams formed the New Meadowlands Stadium Company, LLC (now MetLife Stadium Company), a 50/50 joint venture, to build and operate the stadium. The two teams leased the parcel of land on which the stadium stands from the NJSEA for a 25-year term, with options to extend it which could eventually reach 97 years. After the 15th year of the lease, and every five years, hence; one of the two teams may opt out of the lease after giving the state 12 months notice. The first such opportunity to opt out will occur in 2025 with a notice date of 2024. There will then be an opportunity to opt out in 2030, 2035, 2040, etc... However, if one team leaves for a new stadium, the other team would have to remain for the remainder of the lease. However, the high cost of building and relocating to a stadium makes it very unlikely. The teams also get parking revenue from the Meadowlands' western parking lots year round, even when there are no events at the stadium (this would occur when other parts of the Meadowlands host events).

Naming rights
Allianz, a financial services and insurance company based in Munich, Germany, expressed interest in purchasing naming rights to the stadium. The proposal was for a period of up to 30 years, and was estimated to be valued at between $20 million and US$30 million. However, it sparked protests from New York's Jewish community (the largest outside of Israel) and the Anti-Defamation League, which opposed the move due to close ties in the past between Allianz and the government of Nazi Germany during World War II. Rabbi Jay Rosenbaum, however, secretary general of the North American Board of Rabbis, agreed that although survivors' sensibilities are understandable, a naming deal is legitimate. "I have found Allianz to be receptive, to be sensitive and a friend of the Jewish people today," he said. Allianz sponsors the venue that inspired the color-change technology for MetLife Stadium: Allianz Arena in Munich. No agreement was reached and talks between Allianz and the teams ended on September 12, 2008.

On June 27, 2011, it was reported that New York City-based insurance company MetLife entered discussions to purchase naming rights to the stadium. The new name, MetLife Stadium, became official when all parties signed a 25-year deal on August 23.

EPA agreement

In June 2009, the New Meadowlands Stadium Corporation and the EPA signed a memorandum of understanding that outlines plans to incorporate environmentally-friendly materials and practices into the construction and operation of MetLife Stadium. The agreement includes strategies to reduce air pollution, conserve water, and energy, improve waste management, and reduce the environmental impact of construction. The goal of the agreement is to save the emission of nearly 1.68 million metric tons of carbon dioxide during the stadium's construction and its first year of operation. Under this agreement, the stadium construction must use around 40,000 tons of recycled steel, recycle 20,000 tons of steel from Giants Stadium, install seating made from recycled plastic and scrap iron, and reduce air pollution from construction vehicles by using cleaner diesel fuel, diesel engine filters, and minimizing engine idle times. Other goals of this agreement include providing mass transit options for fans and replacing traditional concession plates, cups and carries with compostable alternatives. The New Meadowlands Stadium Corporation is to report the progress on its goals to EPA every six months. Based on the reports, the EPA has stated it will quantify the benefits of the venue's environmental efforts.

Accessibility and transportation

MetLife Stadium is accessible by car via Exit 16W on the western spur of the New Jersey Turnpike (I-95) and is also located adjacent to NJ Route 3 and NJ Route 120.

Coach USA provides the 351 Meadowlands Express Bus service between MetLife Stadium and the Port Authority Bus Terminal. New Jersey Transit provides the 353 Bus service for select events between MetLife Stadium and Secaucus Junction.

The Meadowlands Rail Line operates on event days between Meadowlands station and Hoboken Terminal via Secaucus Junction, where there is connecting service to Pennsylvania Station (New York City), Pennsylvania Station (Newark), and other New Jersey Transit rail operations. The line opened to the public on July 26, 2009.

Awards and recognition
In 2009, MetLife Stadium was named the "Greenest Stadium" in the NFL by the Environmental Protection Agency (EPA).

In July 2017, MetLife Stadium was named "Venue of the Year" by the Stadium Business Summit. The award is awarded to the world's best stadium, arena or sports venue, that deserves recognition for an outstanding performance over a 12-month period.

Notable events

Firsts and notable moments

 The first event at the stadium was the Big City Classic lacrosse event, held on April 10, 2010. 
 September 12, 2010: The Giants hosted the first NFL regular season game in the stadium's history against the Carolina Panthers, winning 31–18.
 September 13, 2010: The Jets played their first game at the stadium, against the Baltimore Ravens on Monday Night Football, losing 10–9.
 November 14, 2010: The stadium encountered two power outages during a game between the Giants and the Dallas Cowboys. The game was delayed about twenty-five minutes.
 December 19, 2010: The Philadelphia Eagles staged a comeback against the Giants in what has become known as the Miracle at the New Meadowlands, coming back from being down 31–10 with about eight minutes to go in the fourth quarter to win 38–31, capped off by DeSean Jackson's game winning punt return as time expired.
 September 11, 2011: On the 10th anniversary of the September 11 attacks, a ceremony was held prior to the game between the Jets and the Dallas Cowboys honoring the victims of the attacks. The Jets defeated the Cowboys 27–24.
 December 24, 2011: The visiting Giants defeated the hosting Jets 29–14 in what was the biggest regular season match-up between the two New York teams in recent years, due to postseason implications for both sides. Victor Cruz blew open a tight game with a 99-yard touchdown reception. The victory helped propel the Giants into the playoffs while contributing significantly to eliminating the Jets from a postseason appearance.
 January 8, 2012: MetLife Stadium hosted its first NFL playoff game, with the Giants defeating the Atlanta Falcons 24–2 in an NFC Wild Card game, en route to their Super Bowl XLVI championship.
 November 23, 2014: During a 31–28 loss to the Dallas Cowboys on Sunday Night Football, Giants wide receiver Odell Beckham Jr. snagged a 43-yard one-handed touchdown catch from Eli Manning early in the second quarter. The catch, which was completed with only three fingers while Beckham was being interfered with, has been hailed by Cris Collinsworth, Tony Dungy, Victor Cruz, and LeBron James as the best catch of all time.
 February 9, 2020: The New York Guardians of the XFL played their first game at MetLife Stadium against the Tampa Bay Vipers, winning 23−3 in front of 17,634 fans.

Super Bowl XLVIII

On May 25, 2010, it was announced that Super Bowl XLVIII was awarded to the stadium, the first time a Super Bowl would be played in the New York metropolitan area, and the first time that a non-domed stadium in a cold-weather city would host it. However, NFL commissioner Roger Goodell waived this requirement and allowed MetLife Stadium on the ballot because of a "unique, once-only circumstance based on the opportunity to celebrate the new stadium and the great heritage and history of the NFL in the New York region." The game was played on February 2, 2014. The Seattle Seahawks defeated the Denver Broncos 43–8 for their first Super Bowl victory.

WrestleMania

MetLife Stadium has twice hosted WrestleMania—the flagship pay-per-view event of the professional wrestling promotion WWE. WrestleMania 29 was held at MetLife Stadium on April 7, 2013. With 80,676 spectators, it was the third most-attended event in WWE history, and the highest-grossing event in WWE history at $12.3 million. Six years later, MetLife Stadium hosted WrestleMania 35 on April 7, 2019, overtaking WrestleMania 29 with an attendance of 82,265, and $16.9 million in revenue.

Association Football 
MetLife Stadium is also designed for soccer. To prepare for a match, the stadium uses retractable seating in the field level corners to fit a FIFA-sanctioned soccer field. Along with being noted for providing exceptional sight-lines, this has allowed the stadium to host several major international matches.

The first international exhibition match was between Mexico and Ecuador on May 7, 2010, in front of 77,507 fans. The stadium hosted another international exhibition soccer match between the United States and Brazil on August 10, 2010. Brazil won 2–0 in front of a near-sellout crowd of 77,223; the game was played on a temporary grass field.

On March 26, 2011, the stadium hosted an international friendly, between the United States and Argentina, which ended in a 1–1 draw and was played in front of a sellout crowd of 78,926.

On June 9, 2012, Argentina and Brazil played a friendly match, with Argentina winning in a thrilling 4–3 match featuring a Lionel Messi hat-trick. Another exhibition match in preparation for 2014 FIFA World Cup was played on November 14, 2012, between Colombia and Brazil, with Brazil acting as the local team despite a higher affluence of Colombian fans.

On November 15, 2013, Argentina and Ecuador played an international friendly to a 0–0 draw.

On September 9, 2014, the stadium hosted an international friendly between Brazil and Ecuador with Brazil victorious 1–0.

On March 31, 2015, the stadium hosted an international friendly rematch of Argentina and Ecuador with Argentina prevailing 2–1 in front of 48,000 fans.

On June 26, 2016, the stadium hosted the final of the Copa América Centenario—a special U.S.-hosted edition of the Copa América tournament co-organized by CONCACAF, marking the centennial of South America's soccer federation CONMEBOL. After a 0–0 draw after extra time, Chile beat Argentina 4–2 on penalties to win the tournament.

On August 3, 2016, MetLife Stadium hosted a 2016 International Champions Cup match between Real Madrid and F.C. Bayern Munich. Real Madrid won the match 1–0.

On July 22, 2017, a match of the 2017 International Champions Cup was played between FC Barcelona and Juventus. Barcelona won the match 2–1 in front of 82,104 fans.

MetLife Stadium hosted two matches as part of the 2018 International Champions Cup. The first match on July 25, 2018, between Manchester City F.C. and Liverpool F.C., with it ending 2–1 in favor of Liverpool, and the second match on August 7, 2018, between Real Madrid C.F. and A.S. Roma, also ending in a 2–1 victory for Real Madrid.

On September 7, 2018, the stadium hosted the United States and Brazil in an international friendly match as part of U.S. Soccer's "Kickoff Series", which Brazil won by a score of 2–0 with goals from Roberto Firmino and Neymar.

On September 11, 2018, the stadium hosted an international friendly between Colombia and Argentina.

On July 29, 2019, during the 2019 International Champions Cup, the stadium hosted the first Madrid Derby held outside of Europe between Real Madrid and Atlético Madrid, which Atlético won 7–3.

On September 6, 2019, MetLife Stadium hosted the 70th all time meeting of the United States and Mexico with Mexico winning 3–0 in front of a crowd of 47,960.

2026 FIFA World Cup
Metlife Stadium is one of 16 venues, as well as one of the eleven American venues which will host matches during the 2026 FIFA World Cup. During the event, the stadium will be temporarily renamed to "New Jersey Stadium" in accordance with FIFA's policy on corporate sponsored names.

College football
On October 16, 2010, Rutgers hosted Army in the first college football game to be played in the new stadium, with the Scarlet Knights defeating the Black Knights in overtime, 23–20. During the game's second half, Rutgers player Eric LeGrand was injured on a special teams play, defending a Rutgers kickoff, and paralyzed from the neck down.

Syracuse University has hosted selected home games at MetLife Stadium in lieu of the Carrier Dome. The first of these games, branded as New York's College Classic, was played in 2012 against the visiting USC Trojans, who won 42–29. In 2013, the team opened its season against its rival Penn State at the stadium, losing 23–17. In 2014, the team hosted the Notre Dame Fighting Irish at MetLife Stadium, losing 31–15. A rematch was held in 2016, once again losing to the Fighting Irish 50–33.

On November 16, 2019, MetLife Stadium hosted the 61st Cortaca Jug rivalry game between the NCAA Division III Cortland Red Dragons and Ithaca Bombers. With an attendance of 45,161, it set a record for the most-attended football game in Division III history. The game was held at MetLife Stadium as part of season-long commemorations of the 150th anniversary of college football.

On December 11, 2021, MetLife Stadium hosted the 122nd Army-Navy Game. This was the first time the historic matchup was held at MetLife and the fifth time it was held in East Rutherford. Previous matchups were held at Giants Stadium in 1989, 1993, 1997, and 2002. Navy defeated Army 17–13.

Concerts

Other events
The stadium hosted the 12th Siyum HaShas, a celebration of the completion of the Talmud through the -year Daf Yomi study program, on August 1, 2012. At 93,000 seats, it was the highest capacity crowd in the stadium's history, due to on-field seating and a ticket sell-out. The siyum was a Department of Homeland Security level two security event, the most critical short of a presidential visit. On January 1, 2020, it hosted the 13th Siyum HaShas.

The stadium hosts the annual Summer Jam festival sponsored by WQHT FM ("Hot 97").

Since 2012, the stadium has been the main site of the two-day electronic music festival Electric Daisy Carnival's stop in the New York Metropolitan Area bringing electronic acts including Armin Van Buuren, Hardwell, Porter Robinson and Tiësto.

In 2014, two of the "Keep Seeking First God's Kingdom!" International Conventions of Jehovah's Witnesses were held at the stadium.

On July 14 and 15, 2017, the stadium hosted the 18th International Indian Film Academy Awards, the Oscars of Bollywood, for the first time.

On January 16, 2018, the stadium hosted the inaugural ball for newly elected New Jersey Governor Phil Murphy.

MetLife Stadium is also the host of various high school Marching Band and Drum Corps International competitions.

References

External links

 
 MetLife Stadium at StadiumDB.com
 New Meadowlands Stadium Project Scoping Document
 Overgaard Ltd. / Facade Design & Supply
 MetLife Stadium Seating Chart

Media from the New York Jets and New York Giants:
 New Jets Stadium Tour with Woody Johnson
 Virtual Tour and Fly-Through Video of NMS
 January 2010 New Jets Stadium Tour
 NJ/NY 2014 Super Bowl XLVIII Bid Presentation
 Time-lapse Video of Stadium Changeover
 Stadium naming rights
 MetLife Stadium Presser
 Bryant Park MetLife Stadium Celebration

|-

|-

|-

|-

|-

Sports venues in Bergen County, New Jersey
East Rutherford, New Jersey
Meadowlands Sports Complex
Music venues in New Jersey
New York Giants stadiums
New York Jets stadiums
New York Guardians
National Football League venues
American football venues in New Jersey
Soccer venues in New Jersey
Sports venues completed in 2010
Tourist attractions in Bergen County, New Jersey
MetLife
CONCACAF Gold Cup stadiums
2026 FIFA World Cup Stadiums
XFL (2020) venues
2010 establishments in New Jersey